The 2007 season was Daegu F.C.'s 5th season in South Korea's K-League.

Season Summary

For 2007, Kim Hyun-Soo, an experienced defender who had joined the club the previous season, was appointed captain. As well as the regular bunch of draftees from universities around South Korea, Daegu brought in three Brazilians who would play significant roles in the season; Selmir, Luizinho and Eninho. An Argentinean, Maxi, who had played for Spanish La Liga club Racing de Santander, also joined the club but was released mid-season without playing a game.  

The K-League revamped its format, with the season now simply consisting of a conventional league, with the top six teams qualifying to the championship phase.  This didn't help Daegu much, and after their mid-table finishes of the previous two seasons, their performance slipped, and the club placed 12th, winning six games. However, one notable win at home for the club was the 3-1 victory over Ulsan Hyundai Horang-i.  Ulsan represented a major scalp that year, as they would win the League Cup in 2007, as well as eventually finishing third in the K-League.  Daegu also secured a 1-0 victory over FC Seoul in their last match of the regular season. Luizinho played in 23 of the 26 regular season games, scoring 11 goals.  Lee Keun-Ho finished as the top scoring Korean, in joint 7th with 8 goals, Eninho was just behind with 7 goals.

Daegu failed to get out of the group stage in the 2007 Samsung Hauzen Cup.  However, Luizinho did finish as top scorer in the competition, with seven goals from just nine games.  The club achieved a similar level of performance in the FA Cup, where Daegu lost to Incheon United in the round of 16.

Squad

Players In/Out

In

Out

Statistics

|}

K-League

Standings

Korean FA Cup

Matches

Samsung Hauzen Cup

Standings

See also
Daegu FC

References

External links
Daegu FC Official website  

Daegu FC seasons
Daegu FC